{{Infobox person
| name  = Deborah May    
| image =
| caption  =
| birth_name   =
| birth_date   =
| birth_place  =
| death_date   =
| death_place  =
| known_for    = St. ElsewhereNurse BettyThe Kid
| occupation   = 
| years_active = 1973-present
| alma_mater   =
| spouse       = }}

Deborah May is an American actress and model. May won the Miss Indiana beauty pageant in 1970.

 Early life 
May was born in Remington, Indiana.

 Career 
May has appeared in a number of television shows during her career, include the major recurring role as Terri Valere on the NBC medical drama St. Elsewhere (1985–86). Other television credits include Falcon Crest, Remington Steele, The Golden Girls, Star Trek: Deep Space Nine, Star Trek: Voyager, Murder One, The Larry Sanders Show, Seinfeld (episode "The Puffy Shirt"), and ER.

In 2010, May had a recurring role as Catherine Cadence in the British television series The Cut.

From 2016 to 2017, May had a recurring role on the AMC series The Walking Dead as Natania, the leader of Oceanside.

May co-starred in the films Disney's The Kid, Nurse Betty, Johnny Be Good and The Woman in Red.

In 1970 she won Miss Indiana, and the following year was in the Miss America pageant.

In 1981, May directed a documentary titled You Have Struck a Rock''. The documentary encapsulates the history of a non-violent resistance of the black women of South Africa during apartheid. The documentary commemorates the contributions made by South African women in the anti-apartheid movement.

Personal life 
In August of 1983, May married actor George DelHoyo.

May also has two children with DelHoyo.

See also 
 Miss America 1971

References

External links 

Year of birth missing (living people)
Living people
American television actresses
American film actresses
People from Remington, Indiana
20th-century American actresses
21st-century American actresses
21st-century American women